Mubarak Al-Kabeer may refer to:
Mubarak Al-Kabeer Al-Sabah, former ruler of Kuwait
Mubarak Al-Kabeer Governorate, a governorate of Kuwait named after him
Mubarak Al-Kabeer City, a city in Mubarak Al-Kabeer Governorate
Mubarak Al-Kabeer Hospital